NH6 can refer to:
 National Highway 6 (India)
 National Highway 6 (India, old numbering) - NH6 under the old Indian numbering system
 National Highway 6 (Cambodia)

See also 
 List of highways numbered 6